At the Love Library is the debut extended play and the first acoustic extended play by Everlife.  The album was released on April 28, 2009, and consists of 4 songs.

Track listing
 "Resistance"
 "Goodbye" (Acoustic version, from the third studio album Everlife, by Everlife)
 "Attention"
 "Where You Are" (Acoustic version, from the third studio album Everlife, by Everlife)

References

External links

 Everlife's Music at everlifeonline.com

2009 EPs
Everlife albums